Dohwaseo or Korean Royal Academy of Painting is an administrative office of Joseon drawing pictures requested by other administrative offices of Joseon. It was originally called Dohwawon since Goryeo Dynasty until Yejong, but office's class has been dropped, and office was renamed to Dohwaseo.

Organization and roles 

Gyeongguk daejeon documented that Dohwaseo is made of one Je-ju, two Byeol-je, and twenty miscellaneous workers. Main task of this organization was to paint a practical paints to the Nation, such as creating Uigwe. Besides, they drew portraits of King, popular men or maps.

Hwawon 

Artists who worked on Dohwaseo were called Hwanwon or Hwasa. An Gyeon, hwawon during Sejong the Great, is famous for his Shan shui, and left Mongyudowondo and Sasipaljungdo. Kim Hong-do and Shin Yun-bok is also famous Hwawon for their drawings.

See also 
 Six Ministries of Joseon

Institutes equivalent in the rest of the world 
 Académie royale de peinture et de sculpture
 Accademia di San Luca
 Academy of Fine Arts Vienna
 Prussian Academy of Arts

References 

Joseon dynasty